The Korean Airlift was a military operation during the Korean War by the United States Air Force and other air forces participating in the United Nations action. Begun in 1950 under the command of Major General William H. Tunner, it provided air support to the air war in Korea.

The Airlift provided such things as:
 landing and dropping supplies
 troop transport
 paratroop operations
 psychological operations
 medivac and air rescues

Participating Units
 USAF Combat Cargo Command (Provisional)
 RCAF
 Fact Sheet
 Korean Airlift

Military operations of the Korean War